Trige is a town and suburb of Aarhus in Denmark. It has a population of 3,191 (1 January 2022).

Bærmoseskov is a newly raised 80 hectare woodland at the outskirts of Trige, part of the New Forests of Aarhus.

References

External links 

Towns and settlements in Aarhus Municipality
Cities and towns in Aarhus Municipality